Contant is a surname. Notable people with the surname include:

 Alexis Contant (1858–1918), Canadian composer, organist, pianist, and music educator
 George Contant (1864-1930), American outlaw

See also
 Contant, U.S. Virgin Islands